Senator Fanning may refer to:

John Pat Fanning (born 1934), West Virginia State Senate
Ken Fanning (born 1947), Alaska State Senate